Brooklyn is a section/neighborhood of the city of Waterbury, Connecticut. Its name is derived from immigrants who moved up the road from Brooklyn in New York City. The area lies southwest of I-84 and west of route 8, nestled between the sections of Town Plot and the South End. At its height, Brooklyn contained five grammar schools, three drug stores, three theaters, eight bakeries, two breweries, a library, a firehouse, a YMCA, and 22 taverns.

Demographics
The area contained a mix of immigrants looking for work in one of Waterbury's indusrital, manufacturing and business powerhouses before the economic downturn. Irish, Polish, Russians, Lithuanians, Jews and Italians lived in the neighborhood, supporting a vibrant mix of grocers, bakeries, and shops catering to distinctive ethnic traditions.  The Lithuanian community flourished, establishing St. Joseph's Church and school, which was the first Lithuanian church in New England in 1894, and organizing over 20 associations to serve Lithuanian interests in the area, including Lithuanian Girl Scouts, political clubs, choirs, bands, sports teams, saloons and a Lithuanian chapter of the Chamber of Commerce. The majority of Brooklyn now consists of residents with Latin American descent.

References

Neighborhoods in Waterbury, Connecticut